Mikhail Chabaida (born December 29, January 1948 in Chernihiv) is a retired Soviet and Ukrainian defender football player.

Career
Mikhail Chabaida started his career with Desna Chernihiv in 1968 until 1970 where he played 92 matches and scoring 2 goals. With the movement of CSKA Kyiv to the city of Chernihiv, Mikhail become the captain of the club. In 1972 he played for Arsenal Kyiv here played 12 matches and scoring 1 goal. In 1973 the club changed the name to SK Chernihiv and here until 1975 he played 65 matches. In 1976 he played for Khimik Chernihiv, then in 1977 until 1978 he played again for Desna Chernihiv, where he played 79 matches.

References

External links 
Profile on website 

1948 births
Living people
Footballers from Chernihiv
Ukrainian footballers
FC Khimik Chernihiv players
FC Desna Chernihiv players
FC Desna Chernihiv captains
FC CSKA Kyiv players
FC Arsenal Kyiv players
Ukrainian football managers
Association football defenders